Southport London Street was a railway station in Southport, Merseyside.

History
It opened on 9 April 1855 as the East Lancashire Railway's terminus for the Manchester and Southport Railway, a line that it operated with the Lancashire and Yorkshire Railway. The station closed on 1 April 1857, with all services transferred to the adjacent , though the station buildings remained in use as a 'repairing shed' (according to the 1894 Ordnance Survey). An expansion of Chapel Street in 1914 swallowed the site completely, though its name was preserved with platforms 12 and 13 dubbed the "London Street Excursion Platforms". When Chapel Street was rebuilt in the early 1970s, the excursion platforms were filled in to make space for a car park.

References

Sources
 , and Avon Anglia Publications, .
 

Disused railway stations in the Metropolitan Borough of Sefton
Railway stations in Great Britain opened in 1855
Railway stations in Great Britain closed in 1857
Buildings and structures in Southport
1855 establishments in England